Groveland may refer to:

Places
 Groveland, California
 Groveland, Florida
 Groveland, Illinois
 Groveland, Indiana
 Groveland, Kansas
 Groveland, Massachusetts
 Groveland, New York

Other uses
 Groveland Correctional Facility in Livingston County, New York
 Groveland Four, term coined by the media for four African-American men accused of raping a Caucasian woman in Groveland, Florida
 Grovelands Park, Winchmore Hill, London
 Intel Groveland, codename for the Intel CE4200 processor

See also
 Groveland Township (disambiguation)